The 1998 Liga Perdana 2 season is the inaugural season of Liga Perdana 2. A total of eight teams participated in the season.

The lowest four teams from playoff round for Liga Perdana 1 were put into Liga Perdana 2 alongside PDRM, ATM, Negeri Sembilan Chempaka F.C and PKN Johor.

The season kicked off on 4 April 1998. Terengganu won the title and was promoted to Liga Perdana 1.

Teams

Eight teams competing in the first season of Liga Perdana 2.

 Terengganu (1998 Liga Perdana 2 champions)
 Johor
 Kelantan
 NS Chempaka
 Johor FC
 Malacca
 ATM
 PDRM (Relegated to Malaysia FAM League)

League table

1.Terengganu  - 30 PTS (1998 Liga Perdana 2 Champions)

2.Johor  - 25 PTS

3.Kelantan  - 24 PTS

4.NS Chempaka  - 22 PTS

5.Johor FC  - 16 PTS

6.Malacca  - 16 PTS

7.ATM  - 14 PTS

8.PDRM  - 7 PTS (Relegated to Malaysia FAM League)

Champions

References

Liga Perdana 2 seasons
1
Malaysia